A Street in Marly or Place du Marché is an oil painting by British-French artist Alfred Sisley, painted in 1876, at Port-Marly and now in the Kunsthalle Mannheim. A lifesize reproduction of it is shown near the site of its creation as part of the Pays des Impressionnistes trail.

References

Paintings by Alfred Sisley
1876 paintings
Paintings in Baden-Württemberg